The following outline is provided as an overview of and topical guide to classical architecture:

Classical architecture – architecture of classical antiquity, that is, ancient Greek architecture and the architecture of ancient Rome. It also refers to the style or styles of architecture influenced by those.  For example, most of the styles originating in post-Renaissance Europe can be described as classical architecture. This broad use of the term is employed by Sir John Summerson in The Classical Language of Architecture.

What type of thing is classical architecture? 
Classical architecture can be described as all of the following:

 Architecture – both the process and product of planning, designing and construction. Architectural works, in the material form of buildings, are often perceived as cultural and political symbols and as works of art. Historical civilizations are often identified with their surviving architectural achievements.
 Architectural style – classification of architecture in terms of the use of form, techniques, materials, time period, region and other stylistic influences.
 Art – aesthetic expression for presentation or performance, and the work produced from this activity. The word "art" is therefore both a verb and a noun, as is the term "classical architecture".
 One of the arts – as an art form, classical architecture is an outlet of human expression, that is usually influenced by culture and which in turn helps to change culture. Classical architecture is a physical manifestation of the internal human creative impulse.
 A branch of the visual arts – visual arts is a class of art forms, including painting, sculpture, photography, architecture and others, that focus on the creation of works which are primarily visual in nature.
 Form of classicism – high regard in the arts for classical antiquity, as setting standards for taste which the classicists seek to emulate.
 Classicism in architecture – places emphasis on symmetry, proportion, geometry and the regularity of parts as they are demonstrated in the architecture of Classical antiquity and in particular, the architecture of Ancient Rome, of which many examples remained.

Classical architectural structures

Ancient Greek architectural structures 
Ancient Greek architecture – architecture produced by the Greek-speaking people (Hellenic people) whose culture flourished on the Greek mainland and Peloponnesus, the Aegean Islands, and in colonies in Asia Minor and Italy for a period from about 900 BC until the 1st century AD, with the earliest remaining architectural works dating from around 600 BC. Ancient Greek architecture is best known from its temples, and the Parthenon is a prime example.

 Acropolis
 Acropolis of Athens
 Agora
 Ancient Agora of Athens
 Ancient Greek temple – List of Ancient Greek temples
Adyton 
Cella
Opisthodomos
Peristasis
Pronaos
Pteron
Types of temple
 Amphiprostyle
 Antae temple
 Metroon
 Naiskos
 Peripteros
 Pseudodipteral
 Pseudoperipteros
 Ancient Greek theatre – List of ancient Greek theatres
Parodos
Skene
 Bouleuterion
 Greek baths
 Greek gardens
 Gymnasium 
Conisterium
Xystus
 Heroön
 Hippodrome
 Mausoleum
 Monopteros
 Neorion
 Palaestra
 Peribolos
 Propylaea
 Prostyle
 Prytaneion
 Pteron
 Rostral column
 Stadium
 Stoa – List of stoae
 Tholos

Ancient Roman architectural structures 
Ancient Roman architecture – the Roman architectural revolution, also known as the concrete revolution, was the widespread use in Roman architecture of the previously little-used architectural forms of the arch, vault, and dome. A crucial factor in this development that saw a trend to monumental architecture was the invention of Roman concrete (also called opus caementicium).

 Public architecture
 Amphitheatre – List of Roman amphitheatres
 Aqueduct – List of aqueducts in the city of Rome, List of aqueducts in the Roman Empire, and List of Roman aqueducts by date
 Basilica
 Bridge – List of Roman bridges
 Canal – List of Roman canals
 Castellum
 Circus – List of Roman circuses
 Cistern – List of Roman cisterns 
 Dams and reservoirs – List of Roman dams and reservoirs
 Defensive wall
 Dome – List of Roman domes
 Forum
 Hippodrome
 Horreum
 Hypaethral
 Insula
 Monument – List of ancient monuments in Rome, List of monuments of the Roman Forum
 Nymphaeum
 Obelisk – List of obelisks in Rome
 Odeon
 Roman lighthouse
 Roman watermill
 Rostra
 Temple – List of Ancient Roman temples
Antae temple
Mithraeum
 Tetrapylon
 Theatre – List of Roman theatres
Cavea
Scaenae frons
 Thermae – List of Roman public baths
Sphaeristerium
 Tholos
 Triumphal arch – List of Roman triumphal arches
 Victory column
Rostral column
 Private architecture
 Domus
Atrium
Cavaedium
Coenaculum
Cubiculum
Exedra
Fauces
Impluvium
Oecus
Peristylium
Taberna
Tablinum
Triclinium
Vestibulum
 Roman gardens
 Villa
Villa rustica

Architectural styles 
Architectural style
 Byzantine architecture – initially, the early Byzantine architecture was stylistically and structurally indistinguishable from earlier Roman architecture; the ancient ways of building lived on, but relatively soon the architecture developed into a distinct Byzantine style.
 Pre-Romanesque architecture –
 Romanesque architecture – Romanesque architecture is the first pan-European architectural style since Imperial Roman architecture. Combining features of ancient Roman and Byzantine buildings and other local traditions, Romanesque architecture is known by its massive quality.
 Gothic architecture – Gothic architecture (with which classical architecture is often posed), can incorporate classical elements and details, but does not to the same degree reflect a conscious effort to draw upon the architectural traditions of antiquity.
 Renaissance architecture – is a conscious revival and development of certain elements of ancient Greek and Roman architecture. The Renaissance style places emphasis on symmetry, proportion, geometry and the regularity of parts, as they are demonstrated in the architecture of classical antiquity and in particular ancient Roman architecture, of which many examples remained. The classical architecture of the Renaissance from the outset represents a highly specific interpretation of the classical ideas.
 Palladian architecture – European style of architecture derived from the designs of the Italian Renaissance architect Andrea Palladio (1508–1580). Palladio's work was strongly based on the symmetry, perspective and values of the formal classical temple architecture of the Ancient Greeks and Romans.
 Baroque architecture – Baroque and Rococo architecture are styles which, although classical at root, display an architectural language very much in their own right. Baroque architects took the basic elements of Renaissance architecture and made them higher, grander, more decorated, and more dramatic.
 Georgian architecture – set of architectural styles current between 1720 and 1840.  In the mainstream of Georgian style were both Palladian architecture— and its whimsical alternatives, Gothic and Chinoiserie, which were the English-speaking world's equivalent of European Rococo.
 Neoclassical architecture – architectural style produced by the neoclassical movement that began in the mid-18th century, manifested both in its details as a reaction against the Rococo style of naturalistic ornament, and in its architectural formulas as an outgrowth of some classicizing features of Late Baroque. In its purest form it is a style principally derived from the architecture of Classical Greece and the architecture of the Italian architect Andrea Palladio.
 Empire style – sometimes considered the second phase of Neoclassicism, is an early-19th-century design movement in architecture, furniture, other decorative arts, and the visual arts followed in Europe and America until around 1830, although in the U. S. it continued in popularity in conservative regions outside the major metropolitan centers well past the mid-19th century.
 Biedermeier architecture – neoclassical architecture in Central Europe between 1815 and 1848.
 Resort architecture (Bäderarchitektur) – a specific neoclassical style that came up at the end of the 18th century in German seaside resorts and is widely used in the region until today.
 Federal architecture – classicizing architecture built in the United States between c. 1780 and 1830, and particularly from 1785 to 1815. This style shares its name with its era, the Federal Period.
 Regency architecture – buildings built in Britain during the period in the early 19th century when George IV was Prince Regent, and also to later buildings following the same style. The style corresponds to the Biedermeier style in the German-speaking lands, Federal style in the United States and to the French Empire style.
 Greek Revival architecture – architectural movement of the late 18th and early 19th centuries, predominantly in Northern Europe and the United States. A product of Hellenism, it may be looked upon as the last phase in the development of Neoclassical architecture.
 Beaux-Arts architecture –  
 Nordic Classicism – style of architecture that briefly blossomed in the Nordic countries (Sweden, Denmark, Norway and Finland) between 1910 and 1930.
 New Classical Architecture – architectural movement to revive and embrace classical architecture as a legitimate form of architecture for the 20th and 21st centuries.  Beginning first with Postmodern architecture's criticism of modernist architectural movements like International Style, New Classical architecture seeks to be an alternative to the ongoing dominance of Modern architecture.

Architectural elements

Building elements
 Acroterion – ornament mounted at the apex of the pediment of a building
 Aedicula – small inset shrine
 Aegis
 Amphiprostyle
 Anathyrosis
 Anta
 Antefix
 Apollarium
 Apse
 Arch
 Architrave
 Archivolt
 Arris
 Atlas – male figure support
 Bracket
 Bucranium
 Capital
 Caryatid – female figure support
 Cippus
 Coffer
 Colonnade – long sequence of columns, joined together by their entablature
 Column
 Corbel
 Cornerstone
 Cornice
 Crepidoma
 Crocket
 Cryptoporticus
 Cupola
 Decastyle
 Diaulos
 Diocletian (thermal) window
 Dome – List of Roman domes
 Eisodos
 Entablature – superstructure resting on the column capitals
 Epistyle – see Architrave
 Euthynteria
 Finial
 Frieze
 Geison
 Gutta
 Hypocaust
 Hypostyle
 Hypotrachelium
 Imbrex and tegula – interlocking roof tiles used in ancient Greek and Roman architecture
 Intercolumniation
 Keystone
 Metope
 Modillion
 Mosaic
 Oculus 
 Ornament
 Orthostates
 Pediment
 Peristyle
 Pilae stacks
 Pilaster – flat surface raised from the wall to resemble a column
 Plinth
 Portico
 Portico types: tetrastyle, hexastyle, octastyle, decastyle
 Post and lintel
 Pronaos
 Prostyle
 Puteal
 Quoin – masonry blocks in a wall's corner
 Roof – List of Greco-Roman roofs
 Rustication
 Scamilli impares
 Semi-dome
 Sima
 Sphinx
 Spiral stairs – List of ancient spiral stairs
 Spur
 Stoa – covered walkway or portico
 Stylobate
 Suspensura
 Tambour
 Term
 Triglyph
 Tympanum
 Taenia
 Velarium
 Vitruvian opening
 Volute
 Vomitorium

Building materials
 Aggregate
 Ceramic
 Lime mortar
 Marble
 Roman brick
 Roman concrete
 Spolia
 Terracotta

Classical orders
Classical orders
 Aeolic order – an early order of Classical architecture
 Greek orders
 Doric order
 Ionic order
 Corinthian order
 Roman orders
 Composite order
 Tuscan order

Types of buildings and structures
 Amphitheatre
 Bathhouse
 Greek
 Roman
 Bouleuterion
Nymphaeum
 Odeon
 Stoa
 Temple
 Greek
 Roman
 Theater
 Greek
 Roman
 Tholos
 Treasury
 Villa
 Watermill – List of ancient watermills

Classical architecture organizations 
 The Institute of Classical Architecture and Art

Classical architecture publications 
De architectura – treatise on architecture written by the Roman architect Vitruvius and dedicated to his patron, the emperor Caesar Augustus, as a guide for building projects. The work is one of the most important sources of modern knowledge of Roman building methods, planning, and design.
 De re aedificatoria – classic architectural treatise written by Leon Battista Alberti between 1443 and 1452. Although largely dependent on Vitruvius' De architectura, it was the first theoretical book on the subject written in the Italian Renaissance and in 1485 became the first printed book on architecture.
 The Five Orders of Architecture (1562) by Giacomo Barozzi da Vignola.
 I quattro libri dell'architettura (1570) – a treatise on architecture by the architect Andrea Palladio. 
 The Classical Language of Architecture, a 1965 compilation of six BBC radio lectures given in 1963 by Sir John Summerson.

Persons influential in classical architecture 
 John Summerson – one of the leading British architectural historians of the 20th century.
 John Travlos – Greek architectural historian, author.

See also

 Architectural glossary
 Index of architecture articles
 Table of years in architecture
 Timeline of architecture

References
 "Greek Temple." The Macmillan Visual Dictionary. Unabridged Compact ed. 1995. 
 The Elements of Classical Architecture (Classical America Series in Art and Architecture). Gromort Georges (Author), Richard Sammons (Introductory Essay), W. W. Norton & Co. (June 20, 2001);

External links 

 Illustrated Glossary of Classical Architecture
 Classical architecture – article from Encyclopædia Britannica online

Architecture, Classical
Architecture, Classical
Classical architecture
Classical studies
 
Architectural elements
Architectural history
Design history